The Battle of Tabocas, also known as the Battle of Mount Tabocas, was fought between the Dutch and the Portuguese army.

The battle took place on Mount Tabocas, in the Hereditary Captaincy of Pernambuco, on 3 August 1645.  It was won by the Portuguese forces. The battle was the first major victory in the nine-year period of war that would lead to the retreat of the Dutch from Northeastern Brazil.

Notes

References
Lourenço, Paula.Battles of Portuguese History - Defence of the Overseas. - Volume X. (2006)
David Marley, Wars of the Americas: a chronology of armed conflict in the New World, 1492 to the present (1998) 

Tabocas
Tabocas
Tabocas
Tabocas
Tabocas
Portuguese colonization of the Americas
1640s in Brazil
1645 in South America